Yên Lạc is a rural district of Vĩnh Phúc province in the Red River Delta region of northern Vietnam. As of 2003, the district had a population of 145,316. The district covers an area of 107 km². The district capital lies at Yên Lạc.

References

Districts of Vĩnh Phúc province